Labdia chionopsamma is a moth in the family Cosmopterigidae. It was described by Edward Meyrick in 1886. It is found on New Guinea.

References

Natural History Museum Lepidoptera generic names catalog

Moths described in 1886
Labdia